Scott Malcolm Partridge (born 13 October 1974) is an English retired professional footballer who played as a forward in the Football League, most notably for Brentford. In a nomadic league career, he also played for Bristol City, Rushden & Diamonds, Torquay United, Cardiff City, Bradford City, Plymouth Argyle, Scarborough and Exeter City. He was described as "an immensely skilful little striker with a wonderful first touch", while "rarely getting the goals his contribution deserved".

Career

Early years 
A forward, Partridge began his career in the youth system at Grimsby Town, before moving to Bradford City and signing his first professional contract in July 1992. He made just five first team substitute appearances for the Bantams, before moving to First Division club Bristol City on a free transfer on 18 February 1994. He made something of a breakthrough at Ashton Gate, making 66 appearances and scoring eight goals over the course of three seasons, but was forced to spend time away on loan during the 1995–96 season. Partridge joined Third Division club Cardiff City for a £50,000 fee in February 1997, but after 13 months in which he was mainly utilised as a Winger, he departed Ninian Park in March 1998, having made 41 appearances and scored just two goals.

Torquay United 
On 26 March 1998, Partridge returned to Third Division club Torquay United (with whom he had previously had a loan spell during the 1995–96 season) on a free transfer. Despite failing to score in each of his five appearances at the end of the 1997–98 season, Partridge finally found his goalscoring touch during 1998–99, scoring 14 goals in 35 matches before departing Plainmoor in February 1999.

Brentford 
Partridge joined high-flying Third Division club Brentford for a £100,000 fee on 19 February 1999. Paired with Lloyd Owusu in attack, he showed excellent form in what remained of the 1998–99 season, scoring seven goals in 14 matches to help the Bees to the Third Division title after victory over the eventual runners-up Cambridge United on the final day. Back in the Second Division, Partridge scored four goals in an eight-match spell between late August and early September 1999, but scored just twice more to finish a mid-table season with 47 appearances and six goals.

Partridge began the 2000–01 season on the bench, but regained his starting place under caretaker manager Ray Lewington in December 2000. Paired again with Lloyd Owusu, he scored 9 goals between December and the end of the season, to finish with 47 appearances and 10 goals. The 2000–01 season was memorable for Brentford's run to the final of the Football League Trophy, though despite playing the full 90 minutes at the Millennium Stadium, the Bees were beaten 2–1 by Port Vale. New manager Steve Coppell's signing of forward Ben Burgess on loan in August 2001 heralded the beginning of the end of Partridge's time at Griffin Park and after two early 2001–02 season appearances, he departed the club in September 2001. During two-and-a-half seasons with Brentford, Partridge made 110 appearances and scored 23 goals.

Rushden & Diamonds 
Partridge dropped back down to the Third Division to join newly promoted Rushden & Diamonds on a free transfer on 14 September 2001. Aside from a spell of five goals in 12 matches between late October and late December 2001, Partridge failed to recapture any goalscoring form, but did help the team to the 2002 Third Division play-off Final, which was lost 3–1 to Cheltenham Town. He was utilised almost exclusively as a substitute in the early months of the 2002–03 season, before being transfer-listed in December 2002. Partridge departed Nene Park on 26 March 2003 and made 52 appearances and scored five goals for the club.

Exeter City (loan) 
On 31 December 2002, Partridge joined Third Division club Exeter City on a one-month loan. He scored in each of his first two matches and made four appearances before his loan expired, despite attempts by manager Neil McNab to persuade him to stay.

Shrewsbury Town 
On 27 March 2003, Partridge joined Third Division club Shrewsbury Town on a contract running until the end of the 2002–03 season. He made just four appearances before his contract expired.

Non-League football 
Weymouth player-manager Steve Claridge made Partridge his first signing of the 2003–04 season and he signed a three-year contract. He scored 11 goals in 30 appearances before being allowed to join Southern League Premier Division rivals Bath City on a free transfer on 9 January 2004. Partridge went on to have a successful four-and-a-half season spell at Twerton Park, with a pinnacle being the title-winning 2006–07 season, which secured promotion to the Conference South. After recovering from a neck injury, he played on until March 2008, before departing the club to look after his mother. Partridge joined Northern Premier League First Division South club Sheffield in 2008, but moved back up to the Conference South to join Weston-super-Mare on 31 December 2008 and made 9 appearances before retiring at the end of the 2008–09 season.

Personal life 
Partridge's father, Malcolm, was also a professional footballer. As of January 2004, he was living in Bristol.

Honours
Brentford
 Football League Third Division: 1998–99
Rushden & Diamonds
Conference Shield: 2001
Weymouth
Southern League Premier Division second-place promotion: 2003–04
Bath City
 Southern League Premier Division: 2006–07

Individual

 FA Cup Player of the Round: Third qualifying round, 2004–05
 Team of the FA Cup: 2004–05

Career statistics

References

External links

Living people
1974 births
Association football forwards
Association football wingers
Bradford City A.F.C. players
Bristol City F.C. players
Torquay United F.C. players
Plymouth Argyle F.C. players
Scarborough F.C. players
Cardiff City F.C. players
Brentford F.C. players
Rushden & Diamonds F.C. players
Exeter City F.C. players
Shrewsbury Town F.C. players
Weymouth F.C. players
Bath City F.C. players
Weston-super-Mare A.F.C. players
Sheffield F.C. players
Southern Football League players
Northern Premier League players
National League (English football) players
Footballers from Leicester
English footballers